Ibrahima Wadji (born 5 May 1995) is a Senegalese professional footballer who plays as a forward for  club Saint-Étienne.

Career
On 8 August 2017, Wadji joined Molde from Gazişehir Gaziantep.

In July 2018, Wadji joined Haugesund on loan from Molde until the end of the 2018 season, with an opportunity to join Haugesund permanently at the end of the loan. On 4 December 2018, Haugesund confirmed the permanent signing of Wadji on a contract until the end of 2021.

On 21 June 2019, Haugesund confirmed that Wadji had tested positive for Morphine in an anti-doping test after their match against Kristiansund on 19 May 2019.

On 18 August 2021, Wadji signed for Qarabağ on a three-year contract. 

On 30 August 2022, Qarabağ announced that Wadji had been sold to Saint-Étienne. He signed a three-year contract.

Career statistics

References

1995 births
Living people
Senegalese footballers
Association football forwards
Mbour Petite-Côte FC players
Gaziantep F.K. footballers
Molde FK players
FK Haugesund players
Qarabağ FK players
AS Saint-Étienne players
TFF First League players
Eliteserien players
Azerbaijan Premier League players
Ligue 2 players
Senegalese expatriate footballers
Senegalese expatriate sportspeople in Turkey
Expatriate footballers in Turkey
Senegalese expatriate sportspeople in Norway
Expatriate footballers in Norway
Senegalese expatriate sportspeople in Azerbaijan
Expatriate footballers in Azerbaijan
Senegalese expatriate sportspeople in France
Expatriate footballers in France